Kłyżów  is a village in the administrative district of Gmina Pysznica, within Stalowa Wola County, Podkarpackie Voivodeship, in south-eastern Poland.

The village has an approximate population of 1,300. Kłyżów has a football team called "GZS San Kłyżów" which play in the regional league.
Kłyżów also has a Volunteer fire department

References

Villages in Stalowa Wola County